Luigi Tripepi (21 June 1836 – 29 December 1906) was an Italian Roman Catholic cardinal and poet. He was one of the most important Roman Catholic apologists of the 19th century.

Biography

He was born in Cardeto, a small town in the province of Reggio Calabria, in the deepest south of Italy.

He studied at the local seminary and soon became famous for his skills in different subjects: Latin, Greek, theology, history, moral theology and dogmatics. He moved to Rome for further study and in 1864, was ordained a priest. He stayed in Rome for more than 40 years, until his death in 1906. He wrote about 200 works in different languages on a wide range of topics, including: theology, ecclesiastical history, apologetics as well as poetry in Greek, Latin and Italian.

Originally a Jesuit, he left the order in 1865 and was subsequently appointed to a series of important positions in the Church. In 1868, he was appointed Privy chamberlain and beneficiary of the patriarchal Lateran basilica. In 1878 he was appointed Canon of San Lorenzo in Damaso, Rome and, the following year, of San Giovanni in Laterano basilica. In 1885 he was named canon of St. Peter's. His following appointments include: prelate referendary of the Supreme Tribunal of the Apostolic Signatura (1883); secretary of the Commission for Historical Studies (1884);  prefect of the archive of the Holy See (1892); secretary of the Congregation of Rites (1894);  Substitute of the Secretariat of State (1896). He was created  Cardinal-Deacon of Santa Maria in Domnica by Pope Leo XIII on 15 April 1901. He was later also prefect of the Congregation for Indulgences and Sacred Relics, president of the Academy of the Catholic Religion and pro-prefect of the Sacred Congregation of Rites.

Tripepi died in Rome in 1906. He was buried in the chapel of the chapter of the Vatican Basilica in the Campo Verano Cemetery, Rome.  In October 1993 his remains were moved to Mallemace, near Cardeto, and placed in a little mausoleum named after him and built close to a famous sanctuary dedicated to the Holy Mother of Jesus, Madonna Assunta di Mallemace, to whom he was devoted since childhood.

References

Sources

External links
A portrait of the Cardinal
An interesting work related to the Cardinal

1836 births
1906 deaths
People from the Province of Reggio Calabria
20th-century Italian cardinals
Cardinals created by Pope Leo XIII
19th-century Italian Roman Catholic theologians
Italian male poets
Members of the Sacred Congregation for Rites
19th-century Italian poets
19th-century Italian male writers